To The East, Blackwards is the debut studio album by American hip hop group X Clan, released on April 24, 1990, by 4th & B'way Records and Island Records. It was produced entirely by the group and recorded at I.N.S. Recording Studios in New York City.

To the East, Blackwards charted at number 97 on the Billboard Top Pop Albums. "Raise the Flag", the album's lead single, peaked at number 12 on the Hot Rap Singles.

Music and lyrics 
The album's production is characterized by witty scratching and funk beats, including samples of music by Parliament-Funkadelic, Zapp, and Roy Ayers. The group includes producers Grand Architect Paradise and The  Provider Sugar Shaft, lead MC Brother J, and Professor X the Overseer, who punctuates Brother J's raps with certain keywords and phrases.

The group's lyrics heavily promote Afrocentrism, railing against racism and socioeconomic oppression of African-Americans, and feature references to African-American revolutionaries and Egyptian places and deities. Music journalist Jon Pareles writes that "they want to shift the cultural credit back to Africa, instilling pride in a younger black generation and revising the historical record (itself a matter of heated debate)".

Critical reception 

In a contemporary review, DownBeat wrote that X Clan "offer food for thought with a backbeat ... Their mission is to educate, using hip-hop as the medium. And it's funky, too". Jon Pareles of The New York Times called it "incantations for the converted ... rapped in the artificial-sounding tones of radio disk jockeys." In his review for The Village Voice, Robert Christgau facetiously cited its "hallmarks" as "obscure Egyptological insults and flowing funk beats." He viewed it as a product of the rise in "message rap" at the time and stated, "prophets and demagogues of every description join the myriad of hip hop wannabees, enabling lugs like these avowedly non-'humanist' Brooklynites to make their subcultural dent."

In 1998, the album was selected as one of The Sources 100 Best Rap Albums. In a retrospective review, AllMusic's Andy Kellman gave the album four-and-a-half out of five stars and cited it as one of the best hip hop albums of 1990. Kellman observed "an infectious vigor with the way each track is fired off" and stated, "X Clan relentlessly pushes its pro-black motives and beliefs, and though the points are vague at times, at no point does it ever grow tiring." John Book of RapReviews felt that, although the beats were "just revisions of the well worn and proven", the album was about "how Brother J and Professor X presented themselves over those beats, it had the feeling of a live show or even a rough demo."

Track listing

Personnel 
Credits are adapted from the album's liner notes.

X Clan
 Brother J – producer, rapper
 Grand Architect Paradise – producer
 Professor X the Overseer – producer, rapper
 The  Provider Sugar Shaft – producer

Technical credits
 George DuBose – photography
 Hugh Aladdin Ffrench – engineer
 Mitchell Hartman – artwork
 Kevin A. McDonagh – design
 Herb Powers – mastering

Charts

References

External links 
 "X-Clan's Sample-Based Music" at WhoSampled

4th & B'way Records albums
1990 debut albums
X Clan albums
Political music albums by American artists